William R. Badger (1886 – August 15, 1911) was a wealthy pioneer aviator. He was orphaned early in life and inherited a sizable fortune from his parents. He and fellow aviator St. Croix Johnstone of Chicago died in two separate incidents on the same day at the 1911 Chicago International Aviation Meet at Grant Park.

References

External links
full body portrait of William Badger(ebay cloud)
some William R. Badger related portraits(archived)

1886 births
1911 deaths
Accidental deaths in Illinois
Aviators from Pennsylvania
Aviators killed in aviation accidents or incidents in the United States
Victims of aviation accidents or incidents in 1911